Patrick H. "Pat" Lyons (born 1953) is an American politician from New Mexico. He is a former chairman and commissioner of the New Mexico Public Regulation Commission. Lyons, a Republican, was elected in 2010 and re-elected in 2014. He previously served as the New Mexico Commissioner of Public Lands and as a member of the New Mexico Senate.

Early life and education
Lyons was born in Clovis, New Mexico and graduated from Clovis High School in 1972. He earned a Bachelor of Science degree in agricultural economics from New Mexico State University in 1975, and in 1977, received a master's degree in agriculture from Colorado State University.

Career
In 1978 and 1979, Lyons worked in the United States Department of Commerce.

Lyons served in the New Mexico State Senate from 1992 to 2002, representing six counties in northeastern New Mexico.

New Mexico Commissioner of Public Lands
Lyons served as New Mexico Commissioner of Public Lands from January 1, 2003 to December 31, 2010.

New Mexico's commissioner of public lands is responsible for revenue generation through the management of more than 9 million surface acres and 13 million mineral acres held in trust for state’s 22 beneficiaries (including public schools, penal institutions and hospitals).

New Mexico Public Regulation Commission
Lyons served as commissioner of the 2nd District of the New Mexico Public Regulation Commission from 2011 through 2018.

Controversies
During his 2003-2011 tenure as Land Commissioner, Lyons faced criticism after he orchestrated a swap of 7,205 acres of state trust land in White Peak, an area highly valued by hunters, for 3,330 acres of a fellow rancher's land. Sportsmen roundly criticized the deal, pointing out that it put prime hunting land off-limits, and after the state attorney general investigated, the Supreme Court ruled the swap illegal in 2010, and Lyons' successor reversed the deal.

A 2010 audit by the New Mexico Auditor's Office found that Lyons' Land Office had mismanaged or wasted millions of dollars of taxpayer funds.

In his 2018 campaign for another term as Commissioner of Public Lands, Lyons used a list of Land Office lessees from his time in office to solicit donations from them, which drew allegations that such appeals invited the risk of special favors to lessees Lyons would be in charge of regulating if he were elected. A significant portion of Lyons' campaign funding came from the oil and gas industry, and Chevron paid $2 million to a mostly oil-funded PAC that supports Lyons. The land commissioner has jurisdiction over lease rates, rules and air and water safeguards that govern oil and gas leases.

An investigation conducted by KRQE found that Lyons had violated state law by fabricating and awarding himself continuing education credits for routine meetings. According to state law, "to ensure expertise on technical aspects of the job... PRC Commissioners obtain 32 hours of annual continuing education relating to utility regulation. Lawmakers deemed this prerequisite to be so important that, according to statute, any Commissioner who fails to obtain the required education can't collect their salary." The investigation also found that fellow commissioner Lynda Lovejoy did not have the required number of annual continuing education hours.

Personal life
Pat Lyons, a third generation New Mexican, is the owner/operator of Lyons Angus Ranch in Cuervo, New Mexico. He is an active managing rancher/farmer with a continuous cow/calf operation, buying and selling beef cattle, growing/ harvesting/ utilizing alfalfa.

Lyons is married to his wife of 26 years, Sandy. They have three children, Amy, Kimberly, and Daniel.

Awards and recognition
 2006 – Pete Porter Award from the NM Oil and Gas Association
 2005 – Certificate of Appreciation from Chama Middle School for providing technology support
 2004 – Certificate of Appreciation for partnership with Keep New Mexico Beautiful Association
 2002 – President’s Award from the NM Association of Conservation Districts
 1998 – Legislator of the Year from the NM District Attorneys’ Association
 Recognition by the Association of Retarded Citizens
 Recognition by the New Mexico Wild Life Federation
 Recognition by the New Mexico Youth Conservation Corps
 Recognition by the New Mexico Boy Scouts

References

External links
https://www.sfreporter.com/news/2014/08/26/swapper-in-chief/
http://nmindepth.com/2018/10/03/patrick-lyons-fundraising-for-public-land-commissioner-campaign-raises-legal-and-ethical-questions/
http://www.nmprc.state.nm.us/commissioners/patricklyons/index.html

Colorado State University alumni
Living people
New Mexico Commissioners of Public Lands
Republican Party New Mexico state senators
New Mexico State University alumni
Ranchers from New Mexico
1953 births
People from Clovis, New Mexico